François-Joseph Bissot (19 May 1673 – 11 December 1737) was a son of François Byssot de la Rivière and was a member of the Quebec bourgeois.

Bissot had a varied career as a merchant and navigator but is best known as a co-seigneur of Mingan, the other being his brother, Jean-Baptiste Bissot de Vincennes.

References 
 
 Seigneurie de Mingan, Quebec, Canada
 Havre-Saint-Pierre (municipality)

Bissot
Bissot
Bissot